Riverside is a station on the River Line light rail system, located on Franklin Street in Riverside, New Jersey. The station opened on March 15, 2004. 

Southbound service from the station is available to Camden, New Jersey. It is the last station on the line before crossing the bridge over Rancocas Creek northbound to the Trenton Rail Station where there are connections to New Jersey Transit trains to New York City, SEPTA trains to Philadelphia, Pennsylvania, and Amtrak trains. Transfer to the PATCO Speedline at the Walter Rand Transportation Center. 

The station stands in the shadow of the historic Philadelphia Watch Case Company Building, which has been listed on the National Register of Historic Places since January 31, 1978.

Transfers 
New Jersey Transit buses: 419
 BurLink B8

References

External links

 Station from Pavailion Avenue from Google Maps Street View

River Line stations
Railway stations in the United States opened in 2004
2004 establishments in New Jersey
Railway stations in Burlington County, New Jersey
Riverside Township, New Jersey